Princess Rahma bint Hassan (born 13 August 1969) is a Jordanian princess. Her father is Prince Hassan bin Talal. Her mother, Princess Sarvath El Hassan.

She is the cousin of King Abdullah II.

Education 
 Primary school in Amman, Jordan.
 Sherborne School for Girls in Dorset, England
 Trinity College, Cambridge, England - B.A. in Arts with Hons in the Department of Oriental Studies (1991)
 Trinity College, University of Cambridge, England - M.Phil. in International Relations (1992)

Marriage and children 
In July 1997, she married Alaa Batayneh (he was Minister of Energy and Mineral Resources from October 11, 2012 till March 30, 2013.), the son of Arif Al Batayneh (a former member of the House of Representatives, a member of the Senate, Minister of Health and General Director of the Royal Medical Services).

They have two children:

 Aisha (born 2 January 2002).
 Aref (born 15 February 2006).

Career 

She is currently working in the field of education and sports.

As of 2019, she is the President of the Jordan Gymnastics Federation, as well as the president of the Young Muslim Women Association, where she assumed this role, succeeding her mother in 2007.

Awards

National honours 
 : Grand Cordon of the Order of the Independence (2006)

Foreign honours 
 :  Knight Grand Cross of the Order of Orange-Nassau (2006)

References 

1969 births
Living people
People educated at Sherborne Girls
Alumni of Trinity College, Cambridge
House of Hashim
Jordanian princesses
Jordanian Muslims
People from Amman

Grand Cordons of the Order of Independence (Jordan)

Knights Grand Cross of the Order of Orange-Nassau
Jordanian people of Pakistani descent
Jordanian people of Bengali descent
Suhrawardy family